Herentalia is a genus of cetotheriid mysticete in the subfamily Herpetocetinae. Remains have been found in Late Miocene marine deposits in Belgium.

Description
Herentalia is distinguished from other cetotheriids in being larger and more robust, and in having ascending processes of the maxilla with rounded posterior ends. The species name nigra means "black" and refers to the color of the fossilized bone of the holotype.

References

Baleen whales
Miocene cetaceans
Prehistoric mammals of Europe
Fossil taxa described in 2015
Prehistoric cetacean genera